The Sol Plaatje Dam bus crash was one of the worst vehicle accidents of all time, when a coach bus drove into the Saulspoort Dam near the town of Bethlehem, South Africa, killing 51 people on 1 May 2003.

Overview 
The bus was transporting between 80 and 90 trade union delegates to May Day celebrations in the town of QwaQwa in the Free State. The driver of the bus became disoriented when they passed through Bethlehem in the dark, en route to the celebrations. Hopelessly lost, he appears to have turned accidentally onto an unlit gravel path, which led straight onto a jetty into the Saulspoort Dam. The driver was apparently traveling much too fast to stop when the bus drove straight into the water.

The remote location of the accident, combined with the old bus's inadequate safety provisions meant that just ten people escaped the vehicle alive, all of them injured in the crash. The bus sank rapidly following impact with the water, and 80 people were dragged down with it, trapped inside the vehicle. Police did not arrive until the following morning after being notified by survivors, but were only able to recover the bodies of the dead and retrieve the bus as part of their investigation of the tragedy.

Aftermath 
President Thabo Mbeki held a minute's silence for the dead at his May Day speech the following day, and the dead were buried together in a mass funeral at West End (Weseinde) cemetery in Kimberley. The cause of the crash was believed to be negligence on the driver's part, in his failure to prepare a route through a hazardous area, which was compounded by a lack of signs and gates on the dam's access roads.  The bus too was an old model, and did not possess efficient emergency exits or safety equipment, as well as suffering from poor brakes, which may have contributed to the disaster.

The dam was renamed the Sol Plaatje Dam on 1 April 2005. 

Leonard Slabbert, who used a boat to rescue the survivors, was awarded the Mendi Decoration for Bravery (since renamed Order of Mendi for Bravery) (Silver) on 30 November 2003.

See also 
 List of road accidents

References

External links 
 Guardian News Report
 SMH News Report
 News Report on Aftermath

2003 disasters in South Africa
Bus incidents in South Africa
2003 road incidents
2003 in South Africa
May 2003 events in South Africa
Road incidents in South Africa
Deaths by drowning